Marendet is a town in central Niger.

Populated places in Niger